Jérôme D’Ambrosio (born 27 December 1985) is a Belgian former professional racing driver, motorsport executive and former Team Principal of Venturi Racing in Formula E.

He has previously driven for Marussia Virgin Racing and Lotus F1 in the 2011 and 2012 Formula One World Championships. From 2014-2020, he competed in Formula E driving for Dragon Racing and Mahindra Racing. D’Ambrosio achieved three victories in the series, winning the 2015 Berlin ePrix, 2016 Mexico City ePrix and 2019 Marrakesh ePrix.

Racing career

1999–2002: Karting
Born in Etterbeek, Belgium, D’Ambrosio began his career in karting in 1999. By 2002, he was a three-time Belgian champion after winning the Mini class in 1999, Junior class in 2000 and Formula A in 2002. Alongside national success, he won the acclaimed Junior Monaco Kart Cup in 2000 and was the winner of the World Cup Formula A championship in 2002.

2003–2007: Formula Renault, Euroseries 3000, and Formula Master
D’Ambrosio graduated to single-seater competition in 2003 and tasted immediate success by winning the Belgian Formula Renault championship with five wins, driving for Thierry Boutsen Racing. He also contested the German-based Formula König series where he finished fourth in the standings.

For 2004, D’Ambrosio earned a place on the prestigious Renault F1 Driver Development Programme and moved into the French Formula Renault 2.0 series where he finished fourth in the Drivers’ Championship as the highest-placed rookie. He also contested seven races in Formula Renault 2.0 Eurocup.

In 2005, he switched to Italian Formula Renault and finished third in the championship’s Winter Series and fourth overall in the regular season, recording three wins and six podiums across both. He also started six races in the Eurocup, taking two podiums.

D’Ambrosio graduated to the highest category of Formula Renault in 2006, racing in the 3.5 Series for Tech 1 Racing but left the championship after seven races.

After leaving the Formula Renault 3.5 Series, D’Ambrosio switched to Euroseries 3000 with Euronova Racing and drove an impressive campaign to finish fifth in the final standings, despite missing the first half of the season.

He also participated in one round of the FIA GT Championship, driving a Gillet Vertigo in the GT2 class.

In 2007, D’Ambrosio participated in the inaugural season of the International Formula Master series. Racing for Cram Competition, he secured five wins, 11 podiums and seven fastest laps in 16 races to win the championship.

2008–2010: GP2 Series

D’Ambrosio joined Formula One feeder championship, the GP2 Series, in 2008 and also raced in the newly created GP2 Asia Series, both for the DAMS team. He finished 11th in both championships, with two podiums in each series.

He extended his relationship with DAMS in 2009 and finished as the vice-champion in the 2008-09 GP2 Asia Series with four podiums. D’Ambrosio started the 2009 GP2 Series well and recorded three podiums in the first four races and finished ninth in the final standings.

In 2010, D’Ambrosio experienced a breakout season with DAMS and secured his first victory in the championship at Monaco. He later took his first series pole position at his home event at the Circuit de Spa-Francorchamps but retired from the race when leading. He took one further podium at Monza and finished 12th in the standings.

2010–2013: Formula One
In January 2010, D’Ambrosio was named as the Reserve Driver of the Renault F1 Team after rejoining the outfit’s young driver programme.

Later in the year on 16 September, it was announced that D’Ambrosio would make his Formula One race weekend debut, making four practice appearances with Virgin Racing at the Singapore, Japanese, Korean and Brazilian Grands Prix. He placed 21st in his first FP1 appearance at the Marina Bay Street Circuit, finishing two-tenths behind experienced team-mate Timo Glock.

Virgin (2011)

On 21 December, 2010, it was officially announced that D’Ambrosio would race for Virgin Racing in the 2011 Formula One World Championship, replacing Lucas di Grassi and partnering Glock.

In the Virgin garage, D’Ambrosio was affectionately known as ‘Custard’, with the word pasted on his cockpit when he began testing for the 2011 season at Valencia. Ambrosia is a well-known UK brand of custard and rice pudding.

Driving the largely uncompetitive Virgin MVR-02, D’Ambrosio finished 16 of the season’s 19 races and retired from the Malaysian, Italian and Abu Dhabi Grands Prix due to poor reliability with problems with his electronics, gearbox and brakes. D’Ambrosio became the first Belgian driver to compete at the Belgian Grand Prix since Thierry Boutsen in 1993 and finished 17th, beating team-mate Glock.

He finished the season 24th in the Drivers’ Championship with a best of two 14th place finishes in Australia and Canada. Despite beating Glock, D’Ambrosio was replaced by Charles Pic for the 2012 season.

Lotus (2012–2013)
On 24 January, 2012, D’Ambrosio was named as the official Reserve Driver for Lotus F1 for the 2012 season, supporting full-time drivers Kimi Räikkönen and Romain Grosjean. Throughout the season, he did co-commentary work for Sky Sports F1 for Formula One practice sessions, GP2 and GP3 races, and also commentated for the Belgian French-speaking channel, RTBF.

D’Ambrosio replaced Grosjean at the 2012 Italian Grand Prix to make his debut for Lotus after the Frenchman received a one-race ban for causing a multi-car collision at the previous round in Belgium. He qualified 16th for the race and started in 15th due to a 10-place grid penalty for Pastor Maldonado. D’Ambrosio finished in 13th and on the lead lap, 76 seconds behind winner Lewis Hamilton.

D’Ambrosio continued as Lotus F1’s Reserve Driver for 2013.

Blancpain Endurance Series
In 2014, D’Ambrosio switched from single-seaters to GT racing and joined Bentley to race a Continental GT3 in the Blancpain Endurance Series. Alongside team-mates Duncan Tappy and Anthoine Leclerc, D’Ambrosio secured a best result of sixth at the first race of the season at Monza.

2014–2022: Formula E

Dragon Racing

D’Ambrosio joined Dragon Racing to contest the inaugural season of the FIA Formula E Championship, partnering Oriol Servià and Loïc Duval.

2014–15

He scored points on debut by finishing sixth at the 2014 Beijing ePrix and secured his first victory in the series at the 2015 Berlin ePrix, winning the race after initial victor, Lucas di Grassi, was disqualified after violating technical regulations.

D’Ambrosio scored back-to-back podiums at the double-header 2015 London ePrix to finish fourth in the Drivers’ Championship with 113 points, out-racing team-mates Servià and Duval in all but one race during the season.

During the year, D’Ambrosio was the only driver on the grid to finish every race and completed every racing lap in the 2014/15 season, missing out on the top 10 only twice. Dragon Racing finished second in the Teams’ Championship.

2015–16

D’Ambrosio remained with Dragon Racing for the 2015–16 Formula E Championship and was again partnered by Duval. The team used powertrains developed by Venturi Racing.

He finished fifth in the first race of the season in Beijing and scored his first pole position in the series at the 2015 Punta del Este ePrix and went on to finish third. D’Ambrosio recorded his second career victory at the 2016 Mexico City ePrix after original winner, Lucas di Grassi, was disqualified due to a technical infringement.

By finishing third at the season finale in London, D’Ambrosio finished fifth in the Drivers’ Championship with 83 points.

2016–17
D’Ambrosio continued to race for Dragon Racing in the 2016–17 Formula E Championship, with the team manufacturing its own powertrains for the first time after entering a four-year technical partnership with American technology start-up, Faraday Future.

In an uncompetitive package, he secured his best finish of the year at the season-opening race in Hong Kong, in which he finished seventh. D’Ambrosio scored further points in Buenos Aires, New York, and Montreal and finished 18th in the Drivers’ Championship with 13 points.

2017–18
D’Ambrosio raced for Dragon Racing for a fourth successive season in the 2017/18 FIA Formula E Championship. The team’s technical partnership with Faraday Future came to an early conclusion as a result of financial difficulties for the startup.

The team’s package again proved to be uncompetitive and D’Ambrosio registered his first points of the season at the 2018 Santiago ePrix by finishing eighth. He took further points in Punta del Este and Rome.

At the 2018 Zürich ePrix, D’Ambrosio returned to the podium for the first time since the 2016 London ePrix by finishing third. This result marked his best result of the season, in which he finished 14th in the Drivers’ Championship with 27 points, beating team-mates José María López and Neel Jani.

Mahindra
On 13 October, 2018, it was announced that D’Ambrosio would leave Dragon Racing to join Mahindra Racing for the 2018–19 Formula E Championship.

2018–19
D'Ambrosio finished third in the first race of the season in Diriyah and secured his third victory in the series at the 2019 Marrakesh ePrix. After taking further points finishes in Santiago, Mexico City, Sanya and Rome, D’Ambrosio led the Drivers’ Championship at the mid-way point of the season.

Poor fortune impacted the second half of his campaign, with points only falling in New York. He ended the season in 11th in the Drivers’ Championship with 67 points, beating team-mate Pascal Wehrlein.

2019–2020
D’Ambrosio continued with Mahindra Racing for the 2019-20 Formula E Championship, with the team entering a powertrain partnership with ZF Friedrichshafen. The team’s package was largely uncompetitive and struggled for efficiency in race conditions.

D’Ambrosio scored points in the first race of the season in Diriyah and registered his best finish in the first part of the 2020 Berlin ePrix following Formula E’s five-month hiatus as a result of the COVID-19 pandemic.

He finished 16th in the Drivers’ Championship with 19 points, beating team-mates Wehrlein and Alex Lynn. At the end of the season, D’Ambrosio announced his official retirement from professional competition and ended his career with an 18th-placed finish in Berlin.

Venturi Racing

2020–2022
On 30 October, 2020, D’Ambrosio joined ROKiT Venturi Racing as Deputy Team Principal for the 2020–21 Formula E World Championship, taking his first steps into motor racing team management.

In November, 2021, he was promoted to the role of Team Principal following a management restructure, with former team boss, Susie Wolff, being appointed to the position of Chief Executive Officer.

Under D’Ambrosio’s leadership, ROKiT Venturi Racing experienced its most successful campaign to date in the 2021–22 Formula E World Championship, with the team winning five races and scoring 10 podiums in 16 races while also finishing second in the World Teams' Championship with 295 points.

On 16 September, 2022, it was announced that D'Ambrosio had left the team ahead of its transition to Maserati MSG Racing for Season 9.

Other appearances
D'Ambrosio featured in the first episode of the Amazon motoring show "The Grand Tour" as a test driver putting in lap times for the LaFerrari, Porsche 918 and McLaren P1. The episode attracted nearly two million viewers in its first weekend of release.

Personal life 
In 2020, D'Ambrosio married Austrian jewellery designer, Eleonore von Habsburg at the Civil Registry of Monaco. On 20 October, 2021, Eleonore gave birth to their son, Otto D’Ambrosio, named after her grandfather, Otto von Habsburg.

Racing record

Career summary

† As d'Ambrosio was a guest driver, he was ineligible for points.

Complete Formula Renault 3.5 Series results
(key) (Races in bold indicate pole position) (Races in italics indicate fastest lap)

† Driver did not finish the race, but was classified as he completed more than 90% of the race distance.

Complete GP2 Series results
(key) (Races in bold indicate pole position)

Complete GP2 Asia Series results
(key) (Races in bold indicate pole position; races in italics indicate fastest lap)

Complete Formula One results
(key)

Complete Formula E results
(key) (Races in bold indicate pole position; races in italics indicate fastest lap)

† Driver did not finish the race, but was classified as he completed more than 90% of the race distance.

References

External links

 

1985 births
Living people
Belgian Formula One drivers
Belgian racing drivers
Belgian people of Italian descent
GP2 Series drivers
Auto GP drivers
Belgian Formula Renault 1.6 drivers
Formula Renault Eurocup drivers
Italian Formula Renault 2.0 drivers
French Formula Renault 2.0 drivers
FIA GT Championship drivers
International Formula Master drivers
GP2 Asia Series drivers
World Series Formula V8 3.5 drivers
Virgin Racing Formula One drivers
Lotus F1 Formula One drivers
International GT Open drivers
Blancpain Endurance Series drivers
24 Hours of Spa drivers
Formula E drivers
Manor Motorsport drivers
Stock Car Brasil drivers
Graff Racing drivers
Euronova Racing drivers
Tech 1 Racing drivers
Cram Competition drivers
DAMS drivers
Dragon Racing drivers
Mahindra Racing drivers
Campos Racing drivers
M-Sport drivers